Ischionodonta is a genus of beetles in the family Cerambycidae, containing the following species:

 Ischionodonta amazona (Chevrolat, 1859)
 Ischionodonta brasiliensis (Chevrolat, 1859)
 Ischionodonta colombiana Napp & Marques, 1999
 Ischionodonta earina Napp & Marques, 1998
 Ischionodonta iridipennis (Chevrolat, 1859)
 Ischionodonta lansbergei (Lameere, 1884)
 Ischionodonta mexicana Giesbert & Chemsak, 1993
 Ischionodonta paraibensis Napp & Marques, 1998
 Ischionodonta platensis (Chevrolat, 1859)
 Ischionodonta pustulosa (White, 1855)
 Ischionodonta rufomarginata (Fisher, 1937)
 Ischionodonta semirubra (Burmeister, 1865)
 Ischionodonta serratula Napp & Marques, 1999
 Ischionodonta serripes (Bates, 1872)
 Ischionodonta smaragdina (Martins & Napp, 1989)
 Ischionodonta spinicornis (Zajciw, 1970)
 Ischionodonta torquata (Chevrolat, 1859)
 Ischionodonta versicolor (Chevrolat, 1859)
 Ischionodonta viridinigra Napp & Marques, 1998

References

 
Rhopalophorini